Michael Joseph Stephen Dudikoff Jr. (born October 8, 1954) is an American actor and martial artist. Born in New York City, his family later moved to Los Angeles. Dudikoff did different jobs to pay for his education, during this time he became a model. This led him to do acting auditions. He played supporting roles in films and television shows, until he got his break as the lead in the martial arts action film American Ninja (1985).

Dudikoff became an action film leading man and followed up with American Ninja 2: The Confrontation (1986), Avenging Force (1986), Platoon Leader (1988), River of Death (1989), Soldier Boyz (1996), Bounty Hunters (1996), Bounty Hunters 2: Hardball (1997), etc.

In the 2000s, Dudikoff started to work in real estate, and made film appearances in the 2010s.

Early life 
Dudikoff's father, Michael Joseph Stephen Dudikoff Sr., was Eastern Orthodox Christian. Born in New York to Belarusian immigrants Mary Bogdanova and John Dudikoff, Michael Sr. served in the Army before marrying Dudikoff's mother, Rita T. Girardin, a French-Canadian piano player from Quebec. The couple moved to California and had five children; the fourth, Michael Jr., was diagnosed with dyslexia.

Dudikoff graduated from West High School in Torrance, California, and went on to study child psychology at Harbor College.

Career

Mid 1970s to 1985: Modeling and early roles
To pay for his education, Dudikoff worked at a rehabilitation center for abused youth called Cedar House and waited tables at Beachbum Burt's in Redondo Beach, California. He was eventually approached to do some modelling, and did a catwalk at a shopping mall.

During lunch one day, Dudikoff served Max Evans, a fashion editor with Esquire magazine, who had come in with some models. Evans asked Dudikoff to walk in a Newport Beach fashion show, and his mother encouraged him to try it out.

After a couple of successful runways, Dudikoff retained an agent at the Mary Webb Davis Agency in Los Angeles. Dudikoff soon entered the high fashion world and counted Calvin Klein and GQ among his clients. He moved quickly to international print modeling and traveled between New York, Los Angeles, and Milan by his late 20s.

Dudikoff soon began acting, and he starred in several commercials for companies, including Coppertone, Coca-Cola for Japan, Army Reserve and Stridex.

Dudikoff's first television role took place after a meeting with theatrical agent Sid Craig. He went for some readings, and in 1978 he landed a supporting role in one episode of the hit TV show Dallas, and shortly after the part as Joanie's first boyfriend in the American sitcom Happy Days. Dudikoff said the president of Paramount Studio happened to be sitting in the audience while they were filming and gave him a contract.

Early 1980s to 1985: Subsequent roles and breakthrough 
In 1980, Dudikoff acted in The Black Marble.

In 1981, Dudikoff acted in Bloody Birthday, and The Best Little Girl in the World.

In 1982, Dudikoff acted in Neil Simon's I Ought to Be in Pictures, Making Love, and Tron. Also that year he was one of the leads in the sitcom Star of the Family.

In 1983, he acted in Uncommon Valor,  one episode of Gimme a Break!, and played Huckleberry Finn in a Columbia Pictures movie-of-the-week called Sawyer & Finn directed by Peter H. Hunt.

In 1984, Dudikoff acted in the comedy film Bachelor Party.

In 1985, The Cannon Group, an independent film company with a streak of successful action films, were looking to produce an action film starring Chuck Norris called American Ninja, which Norris turned down. Shortly after, Cannon went on a worldwide search to find who would play Private Joe Armstrong, the American ninja. Over 400 candidates went on to audition for the part. The producer and owner of Cannon, Menahem Golan, and director Sam Firstenberg thought Dudikoff was the obvious choice for the part. Golan even went on to say that he would be the next James Dean. It was a surprise for Dudikoff, who at the time was mostly known for supporting roles in comedies. It was Dudikoff's first collaboration with actor Steve James, who was hired to play the partner of the American ninja, a role he maintained for the first three installments. On a $1 million budget, it went on to gross over $10 million domestically in the US and did extremely well in foreign markets. This success would establish the start of the American Ninja film franchise, with Dudikoff becoming a regular action star for The Cannon Group. That same year, Dudikoff and John Stockwell were co-leads in Albert Pyun's post-apocalyptic film Radioactive Dreams.

1986 to mid-2000s: Action film leading man 
In 1986, Dudikoff returned to the title role of Joe Armstrong in American Ninja 2: The Confrontation, with Firstenberg directing. The film grossed $4 million domestically in the U.S. That same year, Dudikoff starred as retired secret service agent in Avenging Force, with Steve James, directed by Sam Firstenberg. Also, Dudikoff played the role of Lt. Rudy Bodford in the mini-series North and South, Book II.

In 1987, he had signed an agreement with Cannon Films to star and produce seven films.

In 1988, Dudikoff played the lead in Vietnam war film Platoon Leader, directed by Aaron Norris.

In 1989, Dudikoff starred as an adventurer in Steve Carver's River of Death. 

In 1989, Dudikoff turned down American Ninja 3: Blood Hunt because he didn't want to get type cast in martial arts movies and didn't want to go back to South Africa as he was firmly against the Apartheid movement. 

In 1990, he starred in Midnight Ride.

In 1991, Dudikoff acted in the television film The Woman Who Sinned. That year in American Ninja's fourth instalment American Ninja 4: The Annihilation, he returned to the role of Joe Armstrong.

In 1992, Dudikoff starred in The Human Shield directed by Ted Post.

In 1993, Dudikoff co-starred with Stephen Dorff in Arthur Allan Seidelman's Rescue Me. Also that year, Dudikoff was the lead role in the action TV series Cobra. The hour-long show ran for 22 episodes from 1993–1994. 

In 1994, Dudikoff did his final film with The Cannon Group, called Chain of Command directed by David Worth. 

In 1995, Dudikoff starred in Cyberjack, and Soldier Boyz.

In 1996, Dudikoff starred Bounty Hunters, Moving Target, and Crash Dive.

In 1997, Dudikoff starred in Strategic Command, Bounty Hunters 2: Hardball, and The Shooter. 

In 1998, Dudikoff starred in Black Thunder, Freedom Strike, Musketeers Forever , and Counter Measures a sequel to Crash Dive. He also played acted in the Ringmaster starring Jerry Springer.

In 1999, Dudikoff acted in Sidney J. Furie's In Her Defense, Fred Olen Ray's Fugitive Mind, and The Silencer.

In 2001, Dudikoff acted in Ablaze.

In 2002, Dudikoff played the main villain in Gale Force, starring Treat Williams.  He also starred in Sam Firstenberg's Quicksand, and Fred Olen Ray's Stranded.

2003 to present day: Current works 
Moving forward, Dudikoff worked in real estate.

In 2014, Dudikoff was interviewed for The Go-Go Boys: The Inside Story of Cannon Films and Electric Boogaloo: The Wild, Untold Story of Cannon Films, both highly publicized dueling documentaries about The Cannon Group.

In 2015, Dudikoff played a supporting role in Navy Seals vs. Zombies, released by Anchor Bay Entertainment.

In 2018, Dudikoff acted in Fury of the Fist and the Golden Fleece.

Personal Life 
Dudikoff has been married to Belle since 2004. They have three children: son, Michael Joseph Stephen III; opposite-sex twins, Lyzel and Andrei.

Martial arts and fitness 
Dudikoff had no martial arts training before making the first American Ninja movie, but he was already very athletic. Fight choreographer Mike Stone, an accomplished martial arts expert, assured the producers that Dudikoff would pick up the moves.

Dudikoff has since trained in karate, aikido, judo, and Brazilian jiu-jitsu. He began his training in Brazilian jiu-jitsu with Rorion Gracie and stays connected with the Brazilian jiu-jitsu fighting circuit, including Rigan Machado, an eighth degree red and black belt in Brazilian jiu-jitsu and former world champion.

In a 2012 Q&A, Dudikoff said that he doesn't lift weights, but is a swimmer and does isometric and dance exercises.

Filmography

Film

TV

Video games

References

External links

Michael Dudikoff on Facebook

1954 births
Living people
20th-century American male actors
21st-century American male actors
American people of Russian descent
American people of French-Canadian descent
American male film actors
American male television actors
American practitioners of Brazilian jiu-jitsu
Actors from Redondo Beach, California
Actors with dyslexia